The 2010 ITU Triathlon World Cup was a series of triathlon races organised by the International Triathlon Union (ITU) for elite-level triathletes held during the 2010 season. Eight races were announced as part of the 2010 World Cup series. Each race was held over a distance of 1500 m swim, 40 km cycle, 10 km run (an Olympic-distance triathlon). Alongside a prize purse, points were awarded at each race contributing towards the overall 2010 ITU Triathlon World Championships point totals.

Venues, dates and prize purses

Event results

Mooloolaba

Monterrey

Ishigaki

Des Moines

Holten

Tiszaújváros

Huatulco

Tongyeong

See also
ITU Triathlon World Championships

References

External links

2010
World Cup